Ho Henh Phươc (born 26 August 1940) is a Vietnamese athlete. He competed in the men's decathlon at the 1968 Summer Olympics.

References

1940 births
Living people
Athletes (track and field) at the 1968 Summer Olympics
Vietnamese decathletes
Olympic athletes of Vietnam
People from Ninh Thuận province